Dušan J. Popović (1894–1985) was a Serbian historian, a professor at the University of Belgrade.

His works largely dealt with Serbs living in the 18th century outside of what latter would become known as the Serbia proper.

Works
 Vojvodina: Prilozi proučavanju naše zemlje i našega naroda, Opšti deo Bačka : Prilozi proučavanju etničkih odnosa od sredine 16 veka do 1921 g., Serbian Academy of Sciences and Arts, 1925

References

1894 births
1985 deaths
20th-century Serbian historians
Academic staff of the University of Belgrade
Historians of Serbia